The mixed doubles competition of the table tennis event at the 2017 Southeast Asian Games was held 20 August at MiTEC Hall 7 in  Kuala Lumpur, Malaysia.

Format

Doubles Events
(i) All Doubles events (Men's, Women's and Mixed) shall be played in a single knockout competition format. All matches shall be decided by best-of-five (5) games.

(ii) There will be no playoff match for 3rd and 4th positions. Both losing Semi-Finalists will receive a joint bronze medal each.

Schedule
All times are Malaysian Time (UTC+08:00).

Results

References

External links
 

Mixed doubles